Ernest III of Brunswick-Grubenhagen-Herzberg (by a different counting: Ernest IV; 17 December 1518 in Osterode am Harz – 2 April 1567 in Herzberg Castle, Herzberg am Harz), was a member of the noble family of Guelph and a duke of Brunswick-Grubenhagen.

Life 
Ernest was the eldest son of Duke Philip I of Brunswick-Grubenhagen (1476–1551) and his second wife, Countess Catherine of Mansfeld-Vorderort (1501–1535), eldest daughter of Count Ernest II and his first wife Barbara of Querfurt.  His paternal grandparents were Duke Albert II of Brunswick-Grubenhagen and his wife Countess Elisabeth of Waldeck.

Together with his father and brothers, he took part in a military campaign in southern Germany in 1546, during the Schmalkaldic War, which ended unsuccessfully at Ingolstadt.

Marriage and issue 

On 9 October 1547 in Wolgast, Duke Ernest III married Princess Margaret of Pomerania-Wolgast (1518–1569), eldest daughter of Duke George I of Pomerania and his first wife, Princess Amalia of the Palatinate.  From this marriage only one daughter reached adulthood:
 Elizabeth (born 14 April 1550 in Salzderhelden; died: 11 February 1586 in Østerholm on  Als) 19
 married in August 1568 Duke John II of Schleswig-Holstein-Sonderburg (1545–1622).  That marriage produced 14 children:
 * Dorothea (1569–1593) married Duke Frederick IV of Legnica, Silesia
 * Christian (1570–1633), Duke of Schleswig-Holstein-Sonderburg-Ærø
 * Ernest (1572–1596), Duke of Schleswig-Holstein-Sonderburg
 * Alexander (1573–1627), Duke of Schleswig-Holstein-Sonderburg, married Countess Dorothea of Schwarzburg-Sondershausen
 * August (1574–1596), Duke of Schleswig-Holstein-Sonderburg
 * Mary (1575–1640), abbess of Itzehoe
 * John Adolph (1576–1624), Duke of Schleswig-Holstein-Norburg
 * Anna (1577–1610) married 1601 Duke Bogislaw XIII of Pomerania
 * Sophie (1579–1618) married 1607 Duke Philip II of Pomerania-Stettin
 * Elizabeth (1580–1653) married 1615 Duke Bogislaw XIV of Pomerania
 * Frederick (1581–1658), Duke of Schleswig-Holstein-Norburg married firstly in 1627 princess Juliana of Saxe-Lauenburg and secondly in 1632 Eleanore Princess of Anhalt-Zerbst
 * Margaret (1583–1638) married 1603 Count John VII of Nassau-Siegen
 * Philip (1584–1663), Duke of Schleswig-Holstein-Glücksburg married Princess Sophie Hedwig of Saxe-Lauenburg
 * Albert (1585–1613), Duke of Schleswig-Holstein-Sonderburg

Because Ernest had no sons, after his death, his duchy was inherited by his younger brother Wolfgang.  When he, too, died without a male heir, the duchy was inherited by their youngest brother, Philip II.  With Philip's death, the Brunswick-Grubenhagen line of the House of Guelph died out, and the duchy was merged back into Brunswick-Wolfenbüttel.

Ancestors

References and sources 
 Paul Zimmermann: Das Haus Braunschweig-Grubenhagen, Wolfenbüttel, 1911
 Georg Max: Geschichte des Fürstentums Grubenhagen, Hannover, 1862

Princes of Grubenhagen
1518 births
1567 deaths
16th-century German people
Old House of Brunswick